
The Aerocar IMP (for Independently Made Plane) was an unconventional light aircraft designed by Moulton Taylor and marketed for homebuilding. The IMP and its various derivatives were developed by Taylor's Aerocar business after he had already established himself in the homebuilt market with the Coot amphibian, and at the time of the energy crisis in the United States, were designed to be economical to build and operate.

The IMP was unconventional in configuration in having a pusher propeller powered by a long driveshaft from an engine mounted midway within the fuselage of the aircraft. This provided an aerodynamic advantage over more traditional pusher arrangements by allowing greater streamlining of the fuselage – giving the IMP the appearance of an elongated teardrop. The aircraft's most visually striking feature, however, is its inverted V-tail.

Originally designed as a four-seat aircraft, the original IMP design proved to be too complex and expensive for the market that Taylor was aiming for, and although it was awarded a type certification by the FAA, development was abandoned in favour of scaled-down, single-seat version dubbed the Mini-IMP.

Specifications (IMP)

General characteristics
 Crew: one pilot
 Capacity: 3 passengers
 Length: 22 ft 0 in (6.70 m)
 Wingspan: 29 ft 0 in (8.84 m)
 Height: ft in ( m)
 Wing area: 112 ft2 ( 10.39 m2)
 Empty:  950 lb (430 kg)
 Loaded:  1550 lb (703 kg)
 Maximum takeoff:  lb ( kg)
 Powerplant: 1x Franklin 4R, 200 hp (149 kW)

Performance
 Maximum speed: 150 mph (240 km/h)
 Range: miles ( km)
 Service ceiling:  ft ( m)
 Rate of climb: 800 ft/min ( m/min)
 Wing loading: 13.8 lb/ft2 ( kg/m2)
 Power/Mass:  0.1290 hp/lb (0.04966 kW/kg)
 Propeller diameter:  6 ft (1.82 m)

See also

References

Homebuilt aircraft
Single-engined pusher aircraft
1970s United States civil utility aircraft
IMP
V-tail aircraft